Louis of Savoy (1615 – 16 September 1641) was Count of Geneva, Duke of Nemours, and Duke of Aumale from the death of his father Henry of Savoy in 1632 until his own death in 1641.

Louis never married.  On his death, his titles passed to his brother Charles Amadeus.

1615 births
1641 deaths
House of Savoy
Counts of Geneva
Dukes of Aumale
Dukes of Nemours